Kıyıköy, historically Medea, is a small town on the Black Sea coast in the district of Vize in Kırklareli Province in northwestern Turkey. The population of Kıyıköy was 2,077 according to the 2010 National Census.It became a municipality in 1987. 

Fishing, forestry and tourism are the main local sources of income. The town has a small beach while the surrounding area is covered by dense forest mainly of oak. Two streams, the Kazandere and the Pabuçdere, surround the town in the south and north respectively and flowi into the Black Sea.

The only naturally growing grove of black pine (Pinus nigra) in Turkish Rumelia is found here.

The town hosts the onshore terminal of the Turkstream pipeline from Russia.

History
Kıyıköy is identified with Salmydessus, where according to Greek mythology the Argonauts rescued Phineus from the Harpies. Later it became Medea/Midye, a name which means merely 'Middle' in Greek.

It was occupied by Imperial Russian troops after the Russo-Turkish War of 1877–1878, and later by Bulgarians and Greeks following the Balkan Wars of 1912-1913. According to the Treaty of London, the border of the Ottoman Empire passed through the town for a brief period after the First Balkan War; the border was known as the "Midye-Enez Line" or the Enos-Midia line since the town's name was still Midye at the time. The border was moved further west after the Ottomans regained some territory after the Second Balkan War.

According to the terms of the population exchange between Greece and Turkey that took place in 1923, the mostly Greek and Bulgarian Christian residents of the town were replaced by Turks from Thessaloniki in Greece because of their wide knowledge of maritime matters.

In 1960, the settlement's name was changed from Midye to Kıyıkent because the former was regarded as a foreign-language name.Medea remains a Roman Catholic titular see

Turkstream pipeline 
In 2020 the Turkstream (Turkish: TürkAkım; Russian: Турецкий поток), a double gas pipeline from Anapa near Krasnodar in Russia, linked up with Kıyıköy and went into service. One pipeline continues to Lüleburgaz and supplies Turkey. The second is intended for other countries although its onward route is yet to be determined. It cost €11.4 billion.

Places of interest
St. Nicholas' Monastery is a rock-cut Byzantine era Orthodox monastery, built during the time of Emperor Justinian I (reigned 527-565). The monastery consists of a ground-floor chapel with cells for the monks and storerooms. The basement contains a holy well (hagiasma). The monastery was renovated in 1856 by Metropolitan bishop Matthaios, who also built a wooden annex in front of it (it no longer exists). An inscription reading "St. Nikolas" in Greek lettering is engraved over the arched north entrance.

Kıyıköy Fortress is a fortification, also built during the reign of Justinian Il, that surrounds most of the old town. Examination of the mortar used suggests that it was renovated in the 9th and 10th centuries. The fortress is constructed on a hillside stretching to the coast between Pabuçdere in the north and Kazandere in the south. Its eastern part is completely ruined. They probably rose to  near the (lost) second watchtower. A hidden gate to the south of the southern walls was connected to the fortress by 180 steps. The Ministry of Culture and Tourism restored the Vize Gate using stone, bricks and wood in 1991.

References

External links
 Official website of the municipality of Kıyıköy 
 Miscellaneous images of Kırklareli - Kıyıköy
 Kıyıköy Hotel
 History, Beaches, Regional Geography for Kıyıköy
 Nature and sea photos, Human and house pictures for Kıyıköy
 Kıyıköy Otels, Hostels and Motels with Price

Villages in Vize District
Medea
Fishing communities in Turkey
Populated places of the Byzantine Empire
Tourist attractions in Kırklareli Province
Seaside resorts in Turkey